Charaxes brainei, the Braine's charaxes, is a butterfly in the family Nymphalidae. It is found in north-eastern Namibia, southern Angola and north-western Botswana.

Description
The female forewing upperside differs from that of Charaxes vansoni  in a suffusion of blue into the postdiscal spots. The discal band of the hindwing is similarly suffused blue, and there is slight violaceous shade on the hindwing underside

Biology
The habitat consists of dry savanna.
Flies from October to June; commonest in March and April 
Adults are attracted to fermenting fruit.

The larvae feed on Peltophorum africanum.

Taxonomy
Charaxes brainei is a member of the large species group Charaxes etheocles

References

Victor Gurney Logan Van Someren, 1969 Revisional notes on African Charaxes (Lepidoptera: Nymphalidae). Part V. Bulletin of the British Museum (Natural History) (Entomology)75-166.
African Butterfly Database Range map via search

Butterflies described in 1966
brainei